Joel Fisher may refer to:

Joel H. Fisher, Lieutenant Commander of the US Coast Guard
Joel Fisher, musician in Kids in Glass Houses
Joel Fisher (artist) on List of Guggenheim Fellowships awarded in 1993